In the Bible, Caleb was the great-grandfather of the architect Bezalel. He is mentioned in 1 Chronicles 2:18 as "Caleb son of Hezron". 1 Samuel 25:3 states that Nabal, the husband of Abigail before David, was "of the house of Caleb". It is not stated whether this refers to one of the two Calebs mentioned in the Bible, or another person bearing the same name.

According to North  in 1st Chronicles  the names Carmi (כרמי] (2:4, KahReMeeY, "My Vineyard"] Chelubai(2:9) [כלובי, KLOoBah-eeY] also refer to Caleb [כלב, KehLehB,"Dog"]

References

Books of Chronicles people